The Jodel D.11 is a French two-seat monoplane designed and developed by Société Avions Jodel in response to a French government request for a low-wing aircraft for use by the nation's many emerging flying clubs.

More than 3,000 examples have been built and flown.

History

Designers Édouard Joly and Jean Délémontez based the design on two of their earlier projects; they combined the wing of the projected D.10 with a lengthened and widened version of the D.9 fuselage.  The first example flew on 4 April 1950.  Of conventional tailwheel configuration, the D11 featured a fixed, spatted undercarriage, and accommodated pilot and passenger side-by-side.  The wing panels outboard of the landing gear struts had a marked dihedral.  Various powerplants were installed, typically Salmson 9, Continental O-170 or Continental O-200. The aircraft uses all-wood construction with a single piece box-spar.

D.11s were licence-built by a number of manufacturers in Europe and elsewhere, including Wassmer, Aero-Difusión, and Falconar Avia.  Many examples were also home-built with plans provided by Falconar.

Variants

D.11original version with a 55 hp Salmson 9Adb engine.
D.111D.11 with a  Minié 4.DC.32  engine, built by Jodel.
D.112D.11 with a  Continental A65 engine, built by Jodel, Wassmer (Société Wassmer), SAN (Société Aéronautique Normande), Valledeau, Denize and amateur constructors. The  Continental C90 has been used.
D.112A
D.112D
D.112V
D.113D.11 with a  Continental O-200-A engine, amateur-built. 
D.114D.11 with a  Minié 4.DA.28 engine, amateur-built.
D.115D.11 with a  Mathis 4G-F-60 engine, amateur-built.
D.116D.11 with a  Salmson 9ADr engine, amateur-built.
D.117SAN built D.11, named Grande Tourisme, 223 built, powerplant  Continental C90 engine and revised electrics
D.117A - Alpavia built D.117
D118D11 with a  Walter Mikron II engine, amateur-built.
D119amateur-built D.117
D.119D
D.119DA
D.119V

D.120Wassmer built D.117 named the Paris-Nice, 337 built, powerplant Continental C90.
D.120A - (with airbrakes)
D.120R - ((Remorqueur) Glider Tug)
D.120AR - (Glider Tug with airbrakes)
D.121D.11 with a  Continental A75 engine, amateur-built.
D.122D.11 with a  Praga engine, amateur-built.
D.123D.11 with an  Salmson 5Ap.01 engine, amateur-built.
D.124D.11 with an  Salmson 5Aq.01 engine, amateur-built.
D.125D.11 with a  Kaiser engine, amateur-built.
D.126D.11 with an  Continental C85 engine, amateur-built.
EAC D.127D.112 with a sliding canopy and DR.100 undercarriage; (EAC - Société d'Etudes Aéronautiques et Commerciales).
EAC D.128D.119 with a sliding canopy and DR.100 undercarriage; (EAC - Société d'Etudes Aéronautiques et Commerciales).
D.11 Spécial 
Falconar F11Canadian homebuilt derivative design
Uetz U2-MFGZ
Uetz U2VStraight winged D119 built in Switzerland by Walter Uetz Flugzeugbau
Aero Difusión D-11 Compostela 
Aero Difusión D-112 Popuplane license-built D.112 by Aero-Difusión of Spain.
Aero Difusión D-119 Popuplane license-built D.119 by Aero-Difusión.
Aero Difusión D-1190S Compostela68 built
Blenet RB.01 JozéDerivatives of the D.112 designed by Roger Blenet Powered by Continental A65-8F engines, two known

Specifications (D.117 with Continental C90-14F engine)

See also

References

 
 Taylor, Michael (ed.) (1989) Jane's Encyclopedia of Aviation. Studio Editions: London. p. 27
 Teijgeler, Hans, Jodel.com

External links

 Falconar Aviation

Low-wing aircraft
Single-engined tractor aircraft
1950s French civil utility aircraft
Homebuilt aircraft
Jodel aircraft
Aircraft first flown in 1950